Merak may refer to:

Places
Merak, Bhutan, a village
 Merak, Ladakh, a village in India
Port of Merak, a city in Indonesia

Other uses
Merak (star) or Beta Ursae Majoris, a star in the constellation Ursa Major
Merak Film S.r.l., a defunct dubbing studio in Milan, Italy
Merak Mail Server, now IceWarp Mail Server
Merak Temple, a Hindu temple in Central Java, Indonesia
Maserati Merak, an Italian automobile produced from 1972 to 1983
USS Merak, several ships of the US Navy

See also 

Meråker, a city in Norway
Meraki (disambiguation)